The 2023 season of the American astronomy television show Star Gazers starring Trace Dominguez, which started on January 2, 2023.  Episodes of the television series are released on the show's website at the start of the month, up to a month prior to any episode's broadcast date.

The Star Gazers website lists both Trace Dominguez and Ata Sarajedini as hosts.  However, Dominguez is the only one of the two who has actually appeared on screen in the Star Gazers episodes.

2023 season

References

External links 
  Star Gazer official website
 

Lists of Jack Horkheimer: Star Gazer episodes
2023 American television seasons